Onychogomphus styx is a species of dragonfly in the family Gomphidae. It is found in Kenya, Tanzania, Uganda, Zambia, and possibly Guinea. Its natural habitats are subtropical or tropical moist lowland forests and rivers. It is threatened by habitat loss.

References

Sources

Gomphidae
Taxonomy articles created by Polbot
Insects described in 1961